Hedley Wills (19 March 1940 – 21 February 2013) was an  Australian rules footballer who played with South Melbourne in the Victorian Football League (VFL).

Notes

External links 

1940 births
2013 deaths
Australian rules footballers from Victoria (Australia)
Sydney Swans players
Minyip Football Club players